Holmes Herbert (born Horace Edward Jenner; 30 July 1882 – 26 December 1956) was an English character actor who appeared in Hollywood films from 1915 to 1952, often as a British gentleman.

Early life
Born Horace Edward Jenner, (some sources give Edward Sanger)  Holmes Herbert emigrated to the United States in 1912. He was the first son of Edward Henry Jenner (stage name Ned Herbert), who worked as an actor and comedian in the British theatre.

Career
Holmes Herbert never made a film in his native country but managed to appear in 228 films during his career in the U.S., beginning with stalwart leading roles during the silent era and numerous supporting roles in many classic Hollywood films of the sound era, including Captain Blood (1935), The Charge of the Light Brigade (1936), The Life of Emile Zola (1937), The Adventures of Robin Hood (1938), and Foreign Correspondent (1940).

In silent films, Herbert could play different nationalities, as did his contemporaries like Wyndham Standing, but when sound films came in, their pronounced British accents were revealed.

Herbert is perhaps best known for his role as Dr. Jekyll's friend Dr. Lanyon in Dr. Jekyll and Mr. Hyde (1931), and made something of a career in horror films of the period, appearing in The Terror (1928), The Thirteenth Chair (1929 and 1937), Mystery of the Wax Museum (1933), The Invisible Man (1933), Mark of the Vampire (1935), Tower of London (1939), The Ghost of Frankenstein (1942), The Undying Monster (1942), The Mummy's Curse and The Son of Dr. Jekyll (1952). He also played in several of Universal's cycle of Sherlock Holmes films during the 1940s. He retired from acting in 1952.

Personal life and death
Herbert was married three times. His first wife was actress Beryl Mercer, and his second was Elinor Kershaw Ince, widow of film mogul Thomas H. Ince. Both marriages ended in divorce. His third wife, Agnes Bartholomew, died in 1955, leaving Herbert a widower. He died in 1956 at age 74. He was buried in Forest Lawn Memorial Park, Glendale, California.

Filmography

 His Wife (1915) - John Dennys
 Her Life and His (1917) - Ralph Howard
 The Man Without a Country (1917) - Lt. Philip Nolan
 A Doll's House (1918) - Thorvald Helmar
 The Whirlpool (1918) - Judge Reverton
 The Death Dance (1918) - Arnold Maitland
 The Divorcee (1919) - Sir Paradine Fuldes
 The Rough Neck (1919) - A Half-Breed Indian
 The White Heather (1919) - Lord Angus Cameron
 Other Men's Wives (1919) - Fenwick Flint
 The Market of Souls (1919)
 The A.B.C. of Love (1919) - Harry Bryant
 On with the Dance (1920) - Minor Role 
 His House in Order (1920) - Filmer Jesson
 Black Is White (1920) - Jim Brood
 My Lady's Garter (1920) - Henry Van Derp, aka The Hawk
 The Right to Love (1920) - Lord Falkland
 Lady Rose's Daughter (1920) - Jacob Delafield
 Dead Men Tell No Tales (1920) - Squire John Rattray
 The Truth About Husbands (1920) - Dustan Renshaw
 Her Lord and Master (1921) - R. Honorable Thurston Ralph, Viscount Canning
 Heedless Moths (1921) - The Sculptor
 The Wild Goose (1921) - Frank Manners
 The Inner Chamber (1921) - Edward J. Wellman
 The Family Closet (1921) - Alfred Dinsmore
 Any Wife (1922) - Philip Gray
 A Stage Romance (1922) - Prince of Wales
 Evidence (1922) - Judge Rowland
 Divorce Coupons (1922) - Roland Bland
 Moonshine Valley (1922) - Dr. Martin
 A Woman's Woman (1922) - John Plummer
 Toilers of the Sea (1923) - Sandro
 I Will Repay (1923) - Sir Percy Blakeney
 Week End Husbands (1924) - William Randall
 The Enchanted Cottage (1924) - Maj. Hillgrove
 Another Scandal (1924) - Pelham Franklin
 Her Own Free Will (1924) - Peter Craddock
 Sinners in Heaven (1924) - Hugh Rochedale
 Love's Wilderness (1924) - David Tennant
 The Lost World (1925) - Angry Man at Meeting 
 Daddy's Gone A-Hunting (1925) - Greenough
 Up the Ladder (1925) - Robert Newhall
 Wildfire (1925) - Garrison
 The Wanderer (1925) - Prophet
 Wreckage (1925) - Stuart Ames
 A Woman of the World (1925) - Richard Granger
 The Passionate Quest (1926) - Erwen
 The Honeymoon Express (1926) - Jim Donaldson
 Josselyn's Wife (1926) - Thomas Josselyn
 The Fire Brigade (1926) - James Corwin
 One Increasing Purpose (1927) - Charles Paris
 The Nest (1927) - Richard Elliot
 When a Man Loves (1927) - Jean Tiberge
 Mr. Wu (1927) - Mr. Gregory
 Lovers (1927) - Milton
 The Heart of Salome (1927) - Sir Humphrey
 Slaves of Beauty (1927) - Leonard Jones
 The Gay Retreat (1927) - Charles Wright
 East Side, West Side (1927) - Gilbert Van Horn
 The Silver Slave (1927) - Tom Richards
 Gentlemen Prefer Blondes (1928) - Henry Spoffard
 Their Hour (1928) - Cora's Father
 The Sporting Age (1928) - James Driscoll
 The Terror (1928) - Goodman
 Through the Breakers (1928) - Eustis Hobbs
 On Trial (1928) - Gerald Trask
 The Charlatan (1929) - Count Merlin - aka Peter Dwight
 Careers (1929) - Carouge
 Say It with Songs (1929) - Dr. Robert Merrill
 Madame X (1929) - Noel
 Her Private Life (1929) - Rudolph Solomon
 The Careless Age (1929) - Sir John
 The Thirteenth Chair (1929) - Sir Roscoe Crosby
 The Kiss (1929) - M. Lassalle
 Untamed (1929) - Howard Presley
 The Ship from Shanghai (1930) - Paul Thorpe
 The Single Sin (1931) - Roger Van Dorn
 The Hot Heiress (1931) - Mr. Hunter
 Chances (1931) - Maj. Bradford
 Broadminded (1931) - John J. Hackett Sr.
 Daughter of the Dragon (1931) - Sir John Petrie
 Dr. Jekyll and Mr. Hyde (1931) - Dr. John Lanyon
 Shop Angel (1932) - James Walton Kennedy
 Miss Pinkerton (1932) - Arthur Glenn
 Central Park (1932) - Benefit Emcee 
 Sister to Judas (1932) - Bruce Rogers
 Mystery of the Wax Museum (1933) - Dr. Rasmussen
 The Invisible Man (1933) - Chief of Police
 Beloved (1934) - Lord Landslake
 The House of Rothschild (1934) - Rowerth
 The Count of Monte Cristo (1934) - Judge
 The Pursuit of Happiness (1934) - Gen. Sir Henry Clinton
 The Curtain Falls (1934) - John Scorsby
 Sons of Steel (1934) - Curtis Chadburne
 One in a Million (1935) - Donald Cabot, Sr.
 Cardinal Richelieu (1935) - Noble
 Mark of the Vampire (1935) - Sir Karell Borotyn
 Accent on Youth (1935) - Frank Galloway
 The Dark Angel (1935) - Major in Dugout 
 Captain Blood (1935) - Capt. Gardner
 Wife vs. Secretary (1936) - Frawley 
 Brilliant Marriage (1936) - Mr. Rodney Allison
 The Country Beyond (1936) - Insp. Reed
 Champagne Charlie (1936) - Capt. Dell 
 The White Angel (1936) - War Minister 
 Charlie Chan at the Race Track (1936) - Chief Steward, Melbourne Cup 
 The Gentleman from Louisiana (1936) - Chief Steward
 15 Maiden Lane (1936) - Harold Anderson
 The Charge of the Light Brigade (1936) - Gen. O'Neill 
 House of Secrets (1936) - Sir Bertram Evans - Home Secretary
 Lloyd's of London (1936) - Spokesman
 Stolen Holiday (1937) - Nicole's Dance Partner at Party 
 The Prince and the Pauper (1937) - First Doctor
 The Thirteenth Chair (1937) - Sir Roscoe Crosby
 Slave Ship (1937) - Commander
 The Life of Emile Zola (1937) - Commander of Paris
 Love Under Fire (1937) - Darnley 
 The Girl Said No (1937) - Charles Dillon (scenes deleted)
 Lancer Spy (1937) - Dr. Aldrich 
 The Buccaneer (1938) - Captain McWilliams
 Here's Flash Casey (1938) - Major Addison
 The Black Doll (1938) - Dr. Giddings
 The Adventures of Robin Hood (1938) - Archery Referee 
 Kidnapped (1938) - Judge
 Marie Antoinette (1938) - Herald 
 Say It in French (1938) - Richard Carrington Sr.
 Mr. Moto's Last Warning (1939) - Bentham 
 The Mystery of Mr. Wong (1939) - Prof. Ed Janney
 The Little Princess (1939) - Doctor
 Mystery of the White Room (1939) - Hospital Administrator
 Juarez (1939) - Marshal Randon 
 Wolf Call (1939) - J.L. Winton
 The Sun Never Sets (1939) - Colonial Official 
 Trapped in the Sky (1939) - Fielding
 The House of Fear (1939) - Minor Role 
 Stanley and Livingstone (1939) - Frederick Holcomb
 The Adventures of Sherlock Holmes (1939) - Justice
 Hidden Power (1939) - Dr. Morley
 The Private Lives of Elizabeth and Essex (1939) - Majordomo 
 Intermezzo (1939) - The Doctor 
 20,000 Men a Year (1939) - Dean Norris 
 Rulers of the Sea (1939) - Member of Naval Company 
 Tower of London (1939) - Councilman 
 We Are Not Alone (1939) - Police Inspector
 Everything Happens at Night (1939) - Featherstone
 The Earl of Chicago (1940) - Sergeant-at-Arms 
 British Intelligence (1940) - Arthur Bennett
 An Angel from Texas (1940) - Second Banker 
 Women in War (1940) - Chief Justice
 Phantom Raiders (1940) - Sir Edward 
 Foreign Correspondent (1940) - Asst. Commissioner
 Boom Town (1940) - Doctor 
 A Dispatch from Reuters (1940) - Member of Parliament 
 The Letter (1940) - Robert's Friend at Bar at Party 
 South of Suez (1940) - Simpson
 Rage in Heaven (1941) - The Judge 
 Scotland Yard (1941) - Dr. Woodward 
 Man Hunt (1941) - Saul Farnsworthy
 International Squadron (1941) - Sir Basil Wryxton
 The Men in Her Life (1941) - Second Doctor 
 The Ghost of Frankenstein (1942) - Magistrate
 Danger in the Pacific (1942) - Commissioner
 Lady in a Jam (1942) - Man 
 Invisible Agent (1942) - Sir Alfred Spencer
 Strictly in the Groove (1942) - Commissioner
 The Undying Monster (1942) - Chief Constable 
 Sherlock Holmes and the Secret Weapon (1942) - Sir. Reginald
 Sherlock Holmes in Washington (1943) - Mr. Ahrens
 A Stranger in Town (1943) - Supreme Court Justice 
 Two Tickets to London (1943) - Kilgallen
 The Man from Down Under (1943) - Government Official at Train Station 
 Corvette K-225 (1943) - Commodore Ramsay 
 Calling Dr. Death (1943) - Bryant - the Butler
 The Uninvited (1944) - Charlie Jessup 
 Bermuda Mystery (1944) - Judge 
 The Pearl of Death (1944) - James Goodram
 Our Hearts Were Young and Gay (1944) - Captain 
 The Unwritten Code (1944) - McDowell 
 Enter Arsène Lupin (1944) - Jobson
 The Mummy's Curse (1944) - Dr. Cooper
 Sherlock Holmes and the House of Fear (1945) - Alan Cosgrave
 Jealousy (1945) - Melvyn Russell
 The Strange Affair of Uncle Harry (1945) - Warden 
 Swingin' on a Rainbow (1945) - Butler 
 George White's Scandals (1945) - Lord Michael Asbury 
 Confidential Agent (1945) - Lord Benditch
 Three Strangers (1946) - Sir Robert 
 The Bandit of Sherwood Forest (1946) - Baron 
 Dressed to Kill (1946) - Ebenezer Crabtree
 Cloak and Dagger (1946) - British Officer 
 The Verdict (1946) - Sir William Dawson
 Love Laughs at Andy Hardy (1946) - Dr. White, Minister 
 Over the Santa Fe Trail (1947) - Doc Henderson
 Mr. District Attorney (1947) - Gallentyne 
 The Ghost Goes Wild (1947) - Judge
 Bulldog Drummond at Bay (1947) - Scotland Yard Inspector McIvar
 Ivy (1947) - Mulloy 
 Singapore (1947) - Rev. Thomas Barnes
 Bulldog Drummond Strikes Back (1947) - Scotland Yard Inspector McIvar
 This Time for Keeps (1947) - Norman Randall 
 If Winter Comes (1947) - Mr. Broadhurst, the Chemist 
 The Swordsman (1948) - Lord Glowan
 A Woman's Vengeance (1948) - Warder 
 The Wreck of the Hesperus (1948) - Pastor West
 Sorry, Wrong Number (1948) - Wilkins 
 Johnny Belinda (1948) - Judge 
 Hills of Home (1948) - Hillocks 
 Family Honeymoon (1948) - Rev. Miller 
 Jungle Jim (1948) - Commissioner Geoffrey Marsden
 Command Decision (1948) - Chairman 
 South of St. Louis (1949) - Sir Cecil 
 The Lost Tribe (1949) - Narrator
 The Stratton Story (1949) - Doctor 
 Canadian Pacific (1949) - Head of Canadian Parliament
 Barbary Pirate (1949) - Thomas Jefferson
 Post Office Investigator (1949) - James Seeley
 Mark of the Gorilla (1950) - Narrator 
 The Iroquois Trail (1950) - Gen. Johnson
 To Please a Lady (1950) - Benson - Regina's Butler
 The Magnificent Yankee (1950) - Justice McKenna
 The Law and the Lady (1951) - English Colonel 
 David and Bathsheba (1951) - Jesse 
 Anne of the Indies (1951) - English Sea Captain
 The Son of Dr. Jekyll (1951) - Constable 
 The Unknown Man (1951) - Reverend Michael 
 The Wild North (1952) - Magistrate 
 At Sword's Point (1952) - Mallard 
 The Brigand (1952) - Archbishop

References

External links

1882 births
1956 deaths
English male film actors
English male silent film actors
People from Mansfield
20th-century English male actors
Burials at Forest Lawn Memorial Park (Glendale)
Male actors from Nottinghamshire
British emigrants to the United States